Gaspard Fritz (18 February 1716 – 23 March 1783) was a Genevan violinist and composer of the pre-classical period. He composed symphonies and chamber music.

Life 
Fritz was born in Geneva where his father had moved in 1709  where he "taught to play the violin and other musical instruments". In addition to the training undoubtedly followed with his father, the child continued his studies with Giovanni Battista Somis in Turin.

At the age of twenty, he returned to Geneva and married in April 1737. He only undertook a Parisian tour which turned out to be a failure (1756). In 1759, he played for Voltaire.

Fritz's fame outside Geneva is confirmed by correspondence or by the writings of Charles Burney (États de la musique en France et en Italie, London 1773) following his trip to Switzerland in 1770. It is known that Handel met the composer and that Locatelli loved the works of the Genevan.

Fritz, within a Calvinist society which did not promote the concert or secular opera, found in the common rooms, "The Common Room of Geneva", societies which brought together the community of English origin in Geneva by special authorisation as early as 1738, a space for private expression where instrumental and lyrical music was produced and appreciated.

Around 1737 until his death at the age of 67 in Geneva, he worked as a violinist and taught the instrument and music.

Between 1742 and 1772, Fritz's success is confirmed by the publication of six opuses in Paris and London, reprints as well as counterfeit editions.

Compositions 
 Concerto a 5, violino principale, 2 violini, alto, basso (ca. 1740)
 Sei sonate a quatro stromenti, opus 1 (pub. Walsh, London 1741)
 - in C major 
 - in Bb major 
 - in A major 
 - in G major 
 in F major
 in A major
 VI Sonata a violino o flauto traverso solo col basso, opus 2
 in C major - Allegro, Largo, Vivace
 in D major - Adagio, Allegro, Aria
 in A major - Largo, Vivace, Largo, Presto
 in E minor - Andante, Allegro, Grazioso
 in D major - Andante, Allegro, Vivace
 in G major - Andante, Allegro, Minuetto
 Sei sonate a violino solo e basso, opus 3 (ca.1755)
 Sei sonate a due violini e basso, opus 4
 Sei sinfonie a piu strumenti, opus 6 (ca. 1770)
 -
 -
 In G major
 -
 in F major
 in G minor
 Symphonie N° 1 (Hermann Scherchen publisher, 1940)
 Harpsichord Concerto (pub. Feuille d'Avis de Genève 1774)
 Violin Concerto in E major (manuscript)
 Allegro
 Adagio
 Allegro

Modern editions 
 Gaspard Fritz, Œuvres complètes. Xavier Bouvier (ed.) and Anna Jelmorini and Pascale Darmsteter, series "Musiques à Genève", Université-Conservatoire de musique, 1994–

Recordings 
 Sonates pour flûte, opus 2 - Claire Genewein, flute ; Nicoleta Paraschivescu, harpsichord ; Maya Amrein, violoncello continuo (2008, Guild 1834706)
 Sonates pour violon, opus 3 - Plamena Nikitassova, violin ; Jörg-Andreas Bötticher, harpsichord ; Maya Amrein, violoncello (2013, Pan Classics PC10295)
 Concerto pour violon ; Symphonie n°1 - Jens Lohmann, violin ; English Chamber Orchestra, dir. Howard Griffiths (1993, Novalis 150 099-2)
 Sinfonias - La Stagione Frankfurt, dir. Michael Schneider (March 2011, CPO 777 696-2)

References

Bibliography

Further reading 
 Robert-Aloys Mooser, "Un violoniste genevois du XVIII", Dissonances, i/4 (1923–1924),  
 Hermann Scherchen, "Gaspard Fritz: ein Meister der vorklassischen Sinfonik", Schweizerische Musikzeitung, 80 (1940), . 
 Robert-Aloys Mooser, Deux violonistes genevois: Gaspard Fritz (1716–1783), Christian Haensel (1766–1850), Genève, 1968. 
 Martin Staehelin, "Gaspard Fritz im Urteil eines Zeitgenossen", Schweizerische Musikzeitung, 108 (1968),  . 
 Jacques Horneffer, "Gaspard Fritz, Nicolas Scherrer : deux symphonistes et l’Orchestre de Genève, 1740–1780", Haupt, 1990,

External links 
 
 
 

1716 births
1783 deaths
18th-century classical composers
Musicians from the Republic of Geneva
Swiss classical composers
Swiss classical violinists
Swiss music educators